Thomas Henry Green SJ  (* 19 March 1932 in Rochester, New York; † 13 March 2009 in Manila, Philippines) was an american Jesuit, spiritual director, educator and writer of spiritual books, who taught primarily in the Philippines.

Life 
Thomas Henry Green was born as son of George Charles († 1973) and Marie Margaret Green († 1990). After graduating from catholic The Aquinas Institute of Rochester, he entered the noviciate of the Society of Jesus in Poughkeepsie on September 7, 1949. He studied philosophy and theology at Bellarmine College in Plattsburgh, New York, and at Woodstock College in Maryland. At Fordham University he earned a M.A. degree in education (1957) and a M.S. degree in physics (1960). On 19 June 1963, he was ordained to the priesthood. In 1968, he received his doctorate (PhD) in Philosophy of science from the University of Notre Dame under Ernan McMullin.

Green's teaching career in the Philippines began in 1956, first as a High-School teacher at Ateneo De Cagayan (1956–1958), then as a professor of philosophy and pastoral theology at the Ateneo de Manila University in Manila from 1969, and at the Loyola School of Theology from 1971.
On his return from doctoral studies to the Philippines in 1968, he could speak fluent Tagalog and preach and celebrate Holy Mass in that language.
From 1970 he was spiritual director of novices at San José Seminary in Quezon City, as well as vice-rector of the seminary from 1995.

He also gave lectures and retreats in Australia, Canada, Malaysia, the US and the UK.

Green was a member of the American Catholic Philosophical Association, the British Society for the Philosophy of Science and the Philosophy of Science Association.

Over a span of 23 years, Green published a total of nine books on prayer and spiritual direction, which went into as many as 16 editions sind and were translated into several languages.
Posthumously, a collection of Green's lectures was published under the title Experiencing God.

In 1989 he was awarded the Catholic Authors Award by Asian Catholic Publishers, initiated by Cardinal Sin.

On 5 October 2022, Pope Francis quoted from Green's 1984 book Weeds among the Wheat in his catechesis on the Examination of conscience at the papal general audience.

Publications (selection) 
 Opening to God, A guide to prayer. Ave Maria Press, Notre Dame, Indiana 1977
 When the well runs dry, Prayer beyond the beginnings. Ave Maria Press, 1979
 Darkness in the marketplace: The Christian at prayer in the world. Ave Maria Press, 1981
 Weeds among the wheat: Discernment – Where prayer and action meet. Ave Maria Press, 1984
 A vacation with the Lord: A personal, directed retreat. Ave Maria Press, 1986
 Come down Zachaeus. Spirituality and the laity. Ave Maria Press, 1988
 Drinking from a dry well. Ave Maria Press, 1991
 Prayer and common sense. Ave Maria Press, 1995

External links 
 Thomas Green Obituary (2009)
 Video Tribute to Father Tom Green, SJ; 2009 (YouTube)

References 

20th-century American Jesuits
21st-century American Jesuits
20th-century American Roman Catholic priests
21st-century American Roman Catholic priests
Academic staff of Ateneo de Manila University
People from Rochester, New York
1932 births
2009 deaths
20th-century American educators
21st-century American educators
American Roman Catholic religious writers